Bruce José Djité (born 25 March 1987) is an Australian executive and former association football (soccer) player. As a player, Djite is known for his speed, strength and good height with ball heading skills and previously played in Turkey for professional football team, Gençlerbirliği S.K. of the Süper Lig.

Djite plays internationally for the Australia national team, debuting in 2008, and played in the 2010 FIFA World Cup qualification followed by the 2011 AFC Cup qualification as Australia qualified for their third FIFA World Cup and second consecutive AFC Cup. Djite was named Australia League Young Footballer of the Year for 2008, scoring 10 goals in 22 matches. Djite made a name for himself playing in  the AFC Champions League, reaching the 2008 AFC Champions League final. Djite is the Gold Coast United all-time second highest goal scorer and Adelaide United all-time highest goal scorer.

Djite scored an important equalizer for Süper Lig club and 2008 Turkish Cup finalist Gençlerbirliği S.K. in the 90th minute of the match against Denizlispor, which ended in a 2–2 draw, and assisted an important goal in the 90th minute of the match against Kocaelispor in a 1–1 draw during the 2008–09 season. Djite was bought by business magnate and Gold Coast United owner  Clive Palmer from Turkish Süper Lig club Gençlerbirliği to re-play in the A-League in 2010–11 season, Djite had scored 10 goals and registered three assists in 23 matches for Clive Palmer's Gold Coast United.

During the 2012 AFC Champions League, Djite scored an important headed goal and last-gasp winner in the 90th minute of the match for Adelaide United against the South Korea K-League three-time AFC Champions League title holder Pohang Steelers, which ended in a 1–0 victory sending Adelaide United to the top of the 2012 AFC Champions League Group E and into the last round of 16 of the 2012 AFC Champions League knockout stage, Djite helped Adelaide United defeat Japan J.League club Nagoya Grampus 1–0 to advance to the quarter-final of the AFC Champions League.

Early life
Djite was born in Arlington County, Virginia, United States and moved to Sydney, Australia, with his parents when he was three years old. Djite's father, Paulin Djite is a professor at the University of Western Sydney. Djite's father was born in Ivory Coast and his mother was born in Togo and has two brothers.
Djite is a multilingual, speaking French, English and Turkish.

Djite joined the Marconi Stallions in 2004 at the age of 16, after the demise of Northern Spirit FC whom Djite signed for in 2002–03 National Soccer League season and continued to play with Marconi Stallions until the end of the 2005–06 season (August 2006). Djite had also trained at the NSW Institute of Sport in Sydney. In 2006, Djite attended the AIS in Canberra on a football scholarship with Nikita Rukavytsya.

Club career

Adelaide United

2006–07 season
In November 2006 at age 19 years old, Djite unsuccessfully trialled for two weeks at SV Werder Bremen of the Bundesliga in Germany. Upon his return to Australia, Djite signed for Adelaide United for the remainder of the 2006–07 A-League season, scoring three goals with an assist in thirteen matches.

2007–08 season
Djite signed a three-year contract with Adelaide United in March 2007 and Djite scored his first goal for Adelaide United in a competitive fixture on 11 April 2007 in AFC Champions League against South Korea K-League champions Seongnam Ilhwa, deftly controlling the ball in the penalty box to volley it into the back of the goal net.
Djite scored his first goal in the A-League for Adelaide United against Brisbane Roar in a 2–2 draw on 25 August 2007 at Suncorp Stadium in 2007–2008 A-League followed by Adelaide United reaching 2008 AFC Champions League final and Djite scoring an increased strike ratio of 10 goals in 22 matches.

Gençlerbirliği

2008–09 season
On 15 May 2008, it was reported that Djite had been released from his contract with Adelaide United to sign for an unnamed European club. On 21 May 2008, Djite agreed to a three-year contract with Süper Lig club Gençlerbirliği in Turkey for the 2008–09 season. Djite made his debut in the Süper Lig on 24 August 2008 in a 1–1 draw with Kocaelispor. Djite scored his first league goal for Gençlerbirliği in the 45th minute against Denizlispor on 25 October 2008. Fellow Australian James Troisi also got off the mark in a game which ended in a 2–2 draw. Djite consistently displayed his lethal acceleration, footspeed and strength in the penalty area and finished 2008–2009 Süper Lig season with 6 goals and two assists in twenty-eight matches played.

2009–10 season
In the 2009–10 Süper Lig off-season, Djite revealed in an interview with FourFourTwo reporter Ben Somerford, the club Hajduk Split in Croatia were interested in his services but he rejected the move.  Djite appeared on nine occasions on loan to Turkish club Diyarbakırspor and on five occasions for Gençlerbirliği with an assist in 2009–10 Süper Lig.

Gold Coast United

2010–11 season
On 28 August 2010, it was announced by billionaire tycoon Clive Palmer that Djite would return home to Australia to play in the 2010–2011 A-League with Gold Coast United  for 3 years, replacing New Zealand striker Shane Smeltz who had joined Gençlerbirliği.
Djite was given the squad number 11 and Djite would unanimously be key to the success of Gold Coast United's attack utilizing his lightning footspeed, physical strength and aerial ability in the last third of the football pitch to score 10 goals and 3 assists in 23 matches including a fine hat-trick in the 37th, 80th and 87th minutes of Gold Coast's 5–1 win and 24th match of the 2010–2011 season at Skilled Park Stadium in Gold Coast against Newcastle Jets on 22 January 2011.

Adelaide United return

2011–12 season
On 23 March 2011, it was announced that Djite had signed a two-year contract until April 2013 for two seasons, the 2011–12 and the 2012–13 seasons with the club that gave him his first A-League contract, Adelaide United.

Djite was given the squad number 11 and scored his first goal for Adelaide United in the 2011–12 A-League on 19 November 2011 by showing his exceptional footspeed and physical strength in the penalty area before sharply shooting past the goalkeeper Tony Warner and into the back of the goal net in the 44th minute of the 1–1 match draw against Wellington Phoenix at Westpac Stadium in New Zealand. Djite's five goals and two assists in twenty-four matches helped Adelaide United in qualifying for the 2012 AFC Champions League with the fifth and final goal being on 12 February 2012 at Skilled Park Stadium in the 42nd minute of Adelaide United's 20th 2011–12 season match and 2–1 win over Gold Coast United.

Loan to Jiangsu Sainty
In March 2011, due to the long 2011–2012 A-League off season Adelaide United agreed for Djite to be loaned to Chinese Super League club Jiangsu Sainty.

Djite was given the squad number 19 and debuted for Jiangsu Sainty in the 2011–2012 Chinese Super League season on 3 April 2011 in the match against Beijing Guoan and Djite scored his first goal in the 18th minute of the match, an equalizer for Jiangsu Sainty in a 1–1 draw against Henan Jianye on 30 April 2011, followed by the winning goal in the 55th minute of the match for Jiangsu Sainty with Djite's speed and strength proving too much for Chinese Super League defenders in a 1–0 win against Chengdu Blades on 18 June 2011 at Nanjing Olympic Sports Stadium. Djite scored 4 goals with an assist in thirteen Chinese Super League matches and helped Jiangsu Sainty to 4th place in the Chinese Super League, scoring the fourth goal for Jiangsu Sainty in the 53rd minute of a 4–0 win against Dalian Shide on 2 July 2011, and played his fourteenth and last Chinese Super League match in Jiangsu Sainty's 15th 2011–12 Chinese Super League match and 1–0 win against Shanghai Shenxin on 6 July 2011.

2012–13 season
Djite decisively scored a headed goal in the 90th minute and 1–0 match winner in the 2012 AFC Champions League for Adelaide United against South Korea K-League club and three-time AFC Champions League winners Pohang Steelers showing his great aerial ability and physical strength in the penalty area to out-muscle two Pohang Steelers defenders  then powerfully heading the ball past the Pohang Steelers goalkeeper Shin Hwa-Yong, the goal helped Adelaide United to top of 2012 AFC Champions League Group E on 4 April 2012 and into the 2012 AFC Champions League Round of 16 where Djite led the Adelaide United attack to defeat Japan J.League club Nagoya Grampus 1–0 on 29 May 2012, and into 2012 AFC Champions League Quarter-finals on 3 October 2012.

On 1 December 2012, Djite scored for Adelaide United to lead 1–0 against reigning A-League champions Central Coast Mariners in the 17th minute by a spectacular and unstoppable left-footed shot from 51.5 metres distance past the Central Coast Mariners goalkeeper Justin Pasfield and into the left-hand corner of the goal net at Central Coast Stadium.

On 3 February 2013, Djite once again scored a miraculous goal for Adelaide United against Western Sydney Wanderers on 61 minutes by splendidly dribbling three Western Sydney Wanderers defenders and then unleashed an unstoppable left-footed shot from 60.2 metres distance past the Western Sydney Wanderers goalkeeper Ante Čović and into the right-hand corner of the goal net. Djite finished two-years and two seasons playing in Australia for Adelaide United in 2012–13 season with two goals, two assists in seventeen 2012–13 A-League appearances and played ten times scoring once with two assists in the 2012 AFC Champions League.

Suwon FC
On 26 July 2016, after showing good form in Adelaide United's championship winning season, Djite signed with Korean club Suwon FC, joining countryman Adrian Leijer.

International career

Djite is an American Australian and chose to play for Australia, although he would also have been eligible for the Ivory Coast national football team, United States national football team and Togo national football team.

Australia U20 national team
Djite was a star striker for the Young Socceroos during their 2006 tournament in South America scoring five goals in thirteen caps and was also chosen in the Australia Under-20 squad to compete at the 2006 AFC Youth Championships, in India.

Australia Olympic team
Djite was the key striker and a mainstay in the Australia Olympic football team qualification matches for the 2008 Olympics and helped the Australia Olympic football team, the Olyroos squad, to qualify for the Beijing Olympics contributing thirteen caps and scoring two goals.

Australia national team
Three days before his 21st birthday, on 22 March 2008, Djite received his first international cap for the Australia national team, the Socceroos, against Singapore, courtesy of national coach Pim Verbeek, as the replacement for, and heir apparent to Mark Viduka for the Australia national football team. Djite was substituted on at half-time and his best chance to score a goal for Australia came when he rounded the Singapore goalkeeper but his shot in the penalty area was blocked by Lionel Lewis, the ball going out for a corner kick.

Djite's first cap for Australia in a competitive match was when he came on as a substitute for Harry Kewell in Australia's 2010 World Cup Qualifier against Iraq on 1 June 2008. Djite then again appeared in the Socceroos next match on 15 June 2008 against Qatar, coming on as a Super-sub for the 2010 World Cup Qualifier in Doha, Qatar.

Playing style

Djité is a quick bustling left forward or striker with great footspeed and acceleration who kicks and shoots the ball well with either foot. Used his extreme physical strength and footspeed to out-run defenders in an A-League 2007–08 season where Djité was crowned and awarded with the Rising-Star-award, after scoring 10 goals in his first full season and then followed by registering six goals and two assists in his first Süper Lig 2008–09 season in Turkey. In 2011, Djité was among the top-goalscorers in the league, registering 10 goals and three assists in twenty-three matches.

Post-playing career
On 3 June 2019, Djite returned to his former club, A-League side Adelaide United FC taking up the role of Director of Football. He left the role in July 2021 to become the CEO of the Committee for Adelaide. On 30 November 2022, Djite was appointed as executive director of the South Australian Property Council.

Personal life
Bruce is an ambassador for All Together Now, Australia's only national charity with the sole focus of erasing racism.

Bruce is also an ambassador for Little Heroes Foundation, a South Australian charity that supports seriously ill children and their families.

Career statistics

Club

International

Honours
Adelaide United
 A-League Pre-Season Challenge Cup: 2007
 FFA Cup: 2014
 A-League Premiership: 2015–16
 A-League Championship: 2015–16

Individual
 A-League Young Footballer of the Year: 2007–08
 Rising Star Award: 2007–08
 Best Team Man Award: 2012–13

References

External links

 
 
 
 
 
 FFA – Socceroo profile 
 	

1987 births
Living people
People from Washington, D.C.
Australian soccer players
Australian expatriate soccer players
Association football forwards
Adelaide United FC players
A-League Men players
American emigrants to Australia
Australian people of Ivorian descent
Sportspeople of Ivorian descent
Australian people of Togolese descent
Sportspeople of Togolese descent
American people of Ivorian descent
American people of Togolese descent
Australia international soccer players
Gençlerbirliği S.K. footballers
Süper Lig players
Chinese Super League players
Jiangsu F.C. players
Expatriate footballers in China
Suwon FC players
K League 1 players
Expatriate footballers in South Korea
Australian Institute of Sport soccer players
New South Wales Institute of Sport alumni
Gold Coast United FC players